The most popular Latin pop songs in 2002, ranked by radio airplay audience impressions and measured by Nielsen BDS.

References

United States Latin Pop Airplay
2002
2002 in Latin music